L-694247 is a somewhat selective 5-HT1D agonist, with a 10-fold greater affinity for the 5-HT1B receptor, and 25-fold greater affinity for the 5-HT1A receptor. When L-694247 was injected intraventricularly in dehydrated rats, it inhibited water intake. Pre-treatment with a 5-HT1D antagonist abolished this effect. Administration of L-694,247 to normally hydrated rats had no effect on water intake.

References

Serotonin receptor agonists
Sulfonamides
Tryptamines
Oxadiazoles
5-HT1D agonists